Jeff Widener (born August 11, 1956) is an American photographer, best known for his image of the Tank Man confronting a column of tanks in Tiananmen Square in the aftermath of the Tiananmen Square protests of 1989 which made him a nominated finalist for the 1990 Pulitzer, although he did not win.

Through the years, he has covered assignments in over 100 countries involving civil unrest and wars to social issues. He was the first photojournalist to file digital images from the South Pole. In 1987, he was hired as Associated Press Picture Editor for Southeast Asia where he covered major stories in the region from the Gulf War to the Olympics. Other assignments included East Timor, Afghanistan, Cambodia, Burma, Syria, Jordan, India, Laos, Vietnam, Pakistan and many more.

Widener is now based in Mexico City.

Background

Widener grew up in Southern California where he attended Reseda High School, Los Angeles Pierce College and Moorpark College majoring in photojournalism. In 1974 he received the Kodak Scholastic National Photography Scholarship, beating out 8,000 students from across the United States. The prize included a study tour of East Africa.

In 1978, Widener started as a newspaper photographer in California and later in Nevada and Indiana. At age 25, he accepted a position in Brussels, Belgium as a staff photographer with United Press International. His first foreign assignment was the Solidarity riots in Poland.

2010 – present Freelance based in Hamburg, Germany
1997–2010 The Honolulu Advertiser – Staff Photographer
1995–1997 United Press International Miami – Staff Photographer
1987–1995 Associated Press – Southeast Asia Picture Editor Bangkok, Thailand
1984–1986 The Miami News – Staff photographer
1981–1984 United Press International – Brussels, Belgium – Staff photographer
1980–1981 The Evansville Press – Staff photographer
1979–1980 The Las Vegas Sun – Staff Photographer
1977–1979 The Whittier Daily News -Staff photographer

Tank Man photo 

Widener was tasked to capture the scene of the Tiananmen crackdown on June 5, 1989. He had brought camera equipment and film to the hotel where he later took the photo, but was at the risk of being denied entry by security personnel. He was helped inside by Kirk Martsen. Widener eventually ran out of film, so he asked Martsen to try and find some. Martsen found John Flitcroft, an Australian backpacker in the hotel lobby, and asked him if he had any spare rolls of film, explaining that Widener had run out of film. John said he would give him the roll of film, if he could come up to the hotel room, which overlooked Tiananmen Square. It was this roll of film which Widener used to take the Tank Man photo. Martsen later borrowed Flitcroft's rented bicycle to deliver the photo film to the AP office at the Diplomatic Compound.

Prior to taking the picture, Widener was injured during the night event of June 3, 1989 after a stray rock hit him in the head during a mob scene on the Chang-An Boulevard. His Nikon F3 titanium camera absorbed the blow, saving his life.

The "Tank Picture", repeatedly circulated around the globe (except in China, where it is banned), is now widely held to be one of the most recognized photos ever taken. America Online selected it as one of the top ten most famous images of all time.

Awards

In addition to being named a finalist for the 1990 Pulitzer Prize in Spot News Photography, Widener has received multiple awards and citations from the Overseas Press Club, DART Award from Columbia University, Harry Chapin Media Award, Casey Medal for Meritorious Journalism, the Scoop Award in France, Chia Sardina Award in Italy, National Headliner Award, New York Press Club, Pictures of the Year International, Best of Photojournalism, Atlanta Photojournalism, Belgian Press Photographers Association and the World Press in the Netherlands.

References

External links

PPN – audio interview
Time Magazine – interview
Resource Magazine – interview
New York Times – interview
NBC The Rachel Maddow Show (video)
BBC – video
Columbia University (video)
USA Today – interview
Smithsonian Magazine – interview 
NPR – interview
International Herald Tribune – article
PetaPixel – interview
The Wall Street Journal – interview (audio)
EPSON Fotoflock – interview
RTE Ireland National Radio – interview (audio)
CBS News – interview
Huffington Post – interview
South China Morning Post – interview
Photography Art Cafe – interview

Associated Press reporters
American photojournalists
Living people
1956 births
People from Long Beach, California
Journalists from California